Bryan Johnson (born August 13, 1988) is an American football linebacker who is currently a free agent. He was signed by the Buffalo Bills as an undrafted free agent in 2014.

College career
Johnson played in 28 games with 10 starts while at West Texas A&M University and he tallied 89 tackles, 16.5 tackles for a loss, eight sacks, eight QB hurries, two fumbles forced and two fumbles recovered. Johnson played at Nassau Community College in Garden City, New York before West Texas A&M and led the Lions to a 19–2 record while being named a two-time All-Conference selection.

Professional career

New York Jets
Johnson was signed by the New York Jets on August 25, 2015. He was waived on August 30.

See also

 List of Buffalo Bills players

References

External links
 Buffalo Bills bio

1988 births
Living people
American football defensive ends
Buffalo Bills players
New York Jets players
West Texas A&M Buffaloes football players
Nassau Lions football players
People from Bellport, New York
Players of American football from New York (state)
Nassau Community College alumni